Leland Felton Foster (July 17, 1910 - death date unknown) was a professional baseball pitcher in the Negro leagues. He played with the Monroe Monarchs in 1932.

References

External links
 and Seamheads

Monroe Monarchs players
1910 births
Year of death missing
Baseball pitchers
Baseball players from Louisiana